George and Mildred is a 1980 British comedy film directed by Peter Frazer Jones. It was an adaptation of the television series of the same name, with Yootha Joyce and Brian Murphy reprising their roles as the two title characters. It was written by Dick Sharples.

Synopsis
Mildred is keen to ascertain whether or not her husband George has remembered their 27th wedding anniversary. Needless to say, he has not. When he finally remembers, he books a table at the restaurant where he first proposed to Mildred. But to his horror, he discovers on arrival that it has been turned into a greasy spoon café run by Hells Angels style bikers. Mildred then decides that she and George will celebrate their 27th wedding anniversary in style at the plush, world famous London hotel - however unhappy George might be at the cost involved. But on arrival, George is mistaken for a ruthless hit-man by a shady businessman (Stratford Johns), who wants a rival eliminated.

Reception
Released on 27 July, less than a month before the death of star Yootha Joyce (who died on 24 August 1980), the film was neither a commercial nor a critical success. One critic has described the film as "one of the worst films ever made in Britain . . . so strikingly bad, it seems to have been assembled with a genuine contempt for its audience."  A writer for The Guardian stated that the film's failure marked "the death knell" for the 1970s British practice of producing motion picture spinoffs based on sitcoms. The film aired on television on Christmas Day 1980, only five months after its theatrical release.

Cast

Yootha Joyce as Mildred Roper
Brian Murphy as George Roper
Stratford Johns as Harry Pinto
Norman Eshley as Jeffrey Fourmile
Sheila Fearn as Ann Fourmile
Kenneth Cope as Harvey
David Barry as Elvis
Sue Bond as Marlene
Nicholas Bond-Owen as Tristram Fourmile
Neil McCarthy as Eddie
Dudley Sutton as Jacko
Garfield Morgan as Big Jim Bridges
Harry Fowler as Fisher
Bruce Montague as Spanish businessman
Michael Angelis as Café proprietor
Hugh Walters as Waiter
Johnnie Wade as Porter
John Carlin as Casino Supervisor
Suzanne Owens as Croupier
Bridget Brice as Receptionist
Robin Parkinson as Receptionist
Roger Avon as Commissionaire
Dennis Ramsden as Bishop

References

External links

1980 films
British comedy films
1980 comedy films
Films shot at EMI-Elstree Studios
Films based on television series
Man About the House
1980s English-language films
1980s British films